Lime Mountain is a promontory on the eastern slopes of Castle Dome, a  mountain, east of Scottsdale in the Superstition Wilderness and the Tonto National Forest.

References 

Landforms of Maricopa County, Arizona
Mountains of Arizona
Mountains of Maricopa County, Arizona